Raybag is a taluka in Belgaum district in the Indian state of Karnataka. It derives its name from the two words namely "Rai" and "bagh" in which "Rai" means king and "bagh" means tiger.

Geography
It has an average elevation of 590 metres (1935 feet).
This place is underdeveloped and is famous for its rich agriculture produce of banana and sugarcane. It has very old railway station which was made by Britishers to keep control on this territory which they used for military administrating office.

Demographics
 India census, Raybag had a population of 18,984. Males constitute 52% of the population and females 48%. Raybag has an average literacy rate of 68%, higher than the national average of 59.5%: male literacy is 75%, and female literacy is 60%. In Raybag, 14% of the population is under 6 years of age.

Other info:     

Raibag is a small town located in the state of Karnataka, India. It is situated at a distance of approximately 200 km from the state capital, Bengaluru. The town is known for its rich cultural heritage and history, as well as its beautiful natural landscapes.

Raibag has a population of around 20,000 people and is surrounded by lush green forests, rolling hills and pristine rivers. The town is also home to several historical monuments and temples, including the famous Mahadeva Temple, which is dedicated to Lord Shiva and is one of the oldest and most revered shrines in the region. This temple attracts a large number of pilgrims and tourists every year, who come to offer prayers and seek blessings from the deity.

Apart from its rich cultural heritage, Raibag is also known for its scenic beauty. The town is surrounded by several beautiful waterfalls and lakes, including the Basavana Betta Waterfall and the Kottureshwara Lake. These natural wonders provide a tranquil escape from the hustle and bustle of city life, and offer visitors an opportunity to connect with nature and rejuvenate their minds and bodies.

Raibag is also an agricultural town, with a large number of its residents being involved in farming activities. The town is well-known for its production of high-quality rice, vegetables, and fruits, which are sold in local markets and also exported to other parts of the country.

In conclusion, Raibag is a charming and picturesque town that offers a unique blend of history, culture, and natural beauty. Whether you are a history buff, a nature lover, or simply looking for a peaceful escape from the city, Raibag is a destination worth visiting. The town’s warm and welcoming people, combined with its rich cultural heritage and natural beauty, make it an unforgettable experience for visitors.

References

Cities and towns in Belagavi district